Maskun Sumadiredja (25 May 1907-4 January 1986) was an Indonesian independence activist and politician. He is now regarded as a National Hero of Indonesia, a title he was posthumously awarded in 2004.

References

1907 births
1986 deaths
National Heroes of Indonesia